Be The Bear is the nom de plume of Swedish artist and producer Christina Wehage.

Previews of her two forthcoming singles, ‘’Erupt’’ and ‘’Mermaid’’, have been featured in international TV commercials. Short versions of both songs have been released on Be The Bear's YouTube channel with over 750 000 views.

Behind the name
In the music press, Wehage has explained that her artist name comes from that she "used to be scared of bears. I used to dream about them every night, chasing me up old wooden staircases [...] When dreams come back again and again, I think it's because you are trying to deal with something. I wasn't facing my fears and challenging myself". "Be The Bear is like an appeal to myself to do the things that I find scary or difficult. To stand up, make noise and challenge myself and others".

Featured in films
 Det är okej att känna hopp

Featured in commercials
 Heart On A Line (Saab 9-4X)
 Barfotavisan (Blomsterlandet) 
 Sparks (Volvo V70 Connected Touch) 
 Song For Elliott (Volvo Family Of 60) 
 Mermaid (Volvo Concept Estate) 
 Erupt (Volvo Cross Country, Winter Story) 
 ‘’Malibu Lover’’ (Volvo Cross Country)

References

External links
 
 YouTube Channel
 Facebook Page

Musicians from Gothenburg
Swedish electronic musicians
Swedish pop singers
Swedish women singers
Swedish women artists
Synth-pop singers